Pramod Madushan Liyanagamage (born 14 December 1993) is a professional Sri Lankan cricketer who currently plays Twenty20 internationals for Sri Lanka. He is a past pupil of Theraputta National School, Hambantotha.

Domestic career
He made his first-class debut for Tamil Union Cricket and Athletic Club in the 2014–15 Premier Trophy on 5 February 2015. He made his List A debut for Jaffna District in the 2016–17 Districts One Day Tournament on 15 March 2017. In April 2018, he was named in Kandy's squad for the 2018 Super Provincial One Day Tournament. In July 2022, he was signed by the Dambulla Giants for the third edition of the Lanka Premier League.

International career
In June 2022, he was named in the Sri Lanka A squad for their matches against Australia A during Australia's tour of Sri Lanka. Later the same month, he was named in Sri Lanka's One Day International (ODI) squad, also for their series against Australia. He made his ODI debut on 24 June 2022, for Sri Lanka against Australia.

In August 2022, he was named in Sri Lanka's T20I squad for the 2022 Asia Cup. He made his T20I debut on 9 September 2022, against Pakistan.

References

External links
 

1993 births
Living people
Sri Lankan cricketers
Sri Lanka One Day International cricketers
Sri Lanka Twenty20 International cricketers
Jaffna District cricketers
Tamil Union Cricket and Athletic Club cricketers